Sudhi Anna is an Indian film director and painter, who works predominantly in Malayalam cinema. He is known for Hallelooya, a film featuring Naren and Meghana Raj in the lead roles. He is a recipient of J. C. Foundation Award for young director.

Biography 
Anna was born in Padiyoor, a small town in Kannur district in the south Indian state of Kerala, in a family which nurtured art; his elder brother, S. Sunil is a known filmmaker who has directed three films viz. Kaliyorukkam, Marubhagham and Visudha Rathrikal. His debut film was Song of Solomon in 2012, which had Sam Jeevan and Divya Das in the lead roles; Mohanlal provided the voice over for the film. He wrote the story and screenplay for the film while Ragesh Narayanan did the cinematography and editing. His next project was Khadolkhachan, a bilingual film in Malayalam and Tamil, starring Vidharth and Shine Tom Chacko, but the film did not materialize. Subsequently, he made Hallelooya, a love story featuring Narain and Meghana Raj and the film was released in May 2016, and was a comeback vehicle for Narain. The screenplay was written by Abhimaan and Suniraj, who were also associated with another Nivin Pauly starrer, Neram. The film, which featured a poem by the Indian Police Service officer, B. Sandhya, fetched him the J. C. Foundation Award for young director.

Anna, who has also conducted several exhibitions of his photographs, drawings and paintings, lives at his riverside house on the banks of Vembuzha River in Kannur with his wife and daughter.

Filmography

References

Further reading

External links 
 
 
 
 
 

Living people
People from Kerala
People from Kannur district
Malayalam film directors
Film directors from Kerala
21st-century Indian film directors
Indian painters
Year of birth missing (living people)